Hidria Spacefolk is a Finnish progressive / psychedelic rock / space rock band. The group's sound is often compared to Kingston Wall and Ozric Tentacles. The band describes their musical style as Astro-Beat. They use many different instruments such as the cello, violin, flute, didgeridoo, marimba, mandolin, sitar and vibraphone.

Hidria Spacefolk's first album was the independently released EP HDRSF-1 in 2001. Their debut full-length, Symbiosis, was released a year later through Silence, a subsidiary label of Wolfgang Records. The band's second full-length album, Balansia, was released in 2004 and included Andy McCoy of Hanoi Rocks as a guest musician. The same year, a compilation album titled Violently Hippy rmxs was also released. The album contains remixes of Hidria Spacefolk's songs done by Finnish electronic music makers.

On July 11, 2004, the band performed at the North East Art Rock Festival in Pennsylvania, US. They were the first group to appear that day. This performance was released as Live Eleven am, in 2005.

In 2005 the band opened the second day of the international progressive rock festival that took place in Moscow, Russia.

Members 

 Mikko Happo – guitars
 Sami Wirkkala – guitars
 Veikko Aallonhuippu (formerly Sutinen) – keyboards & synths (2008- )
 Olli Kari – Xylosynth, mallets & percussions (2010- and on albums Symbiosis, Balansia)
 Kimmo Dammert – bass
 Teemu Kilponen – drums

Hidria Family 

 Janne Lounatvuori – keyboards (1999-2008)

Discography 

HDRSF-1 (2001, EP)
Symbiosis (2002)
Balansia (2004)
Violently Hippy rmxs (2004, compilation)
Live Eleven am (2005, live recording)
Symetria (2007)
Live at Heart (2007, live recording)
Astronautica (2012)

References

External links 

 
 Hidria Spacefolk at Last.fm

Finnish progressive rock groups
Finnish art rock groups
Space rock musical groups
Finnish psychedelic rock music groups